Sar Asiab-e Bala (also Romanized as Sar Āsīāb-e Bālā' also known as Sar Āsīāb, Sar Āsīāb-e Farsangī, Sar Āsīāb Farsangī, Sar Āsīyāb Farsangī, and Sar Āsyāb) is a village in Derakhtengan Rural District, in the Central District of Kerman County, Kerman Province, Iran. At the 2006 census, its population was 67, in 17 families.

References 

Populated places in Kerman County